Vilpas Vikings, also referred to as Salon Vilpas, is a professional basketball club based in Salo, Finland. The team currently plays in the top level Korisliiga. The Vikings are a part of the Salon Vilpas multi-sport club.

In 2021, Vilpas won its first Korisliiga championship.

Current roster

Season by season

Trophies
Korisliiga: (1):
2020–21

Finnish Basketball Cup: (1)
2018–19

Individual awards
Korisliiga MVP
 Tim Kisner (2005)
 Juwan Staten (2017)

Notable players

References

External links
Official website

Nokia, BC
Basketball teams established in 1908
1908 establishments in Finland
Viking Age in popular culture